Aniceto Lacson y Ledesma (April 17, 1857 – February 3, 1931) was the first and only president of the Negros Republic from 1898 to 1901. He is notable for leading the Negros Revolution along with Juan Araneta, and was a sugar baron.

Early life
Of Chinese origin, Lacson was the fifth son of seven children of Lucio Petronila Lacson and Clara Ledesma of Iloílo who migrated to Negros when he was still young. His early education began under private tutelage in Molo. He later studied commerce at the Ateneo Municipal de Manila, where his classmates included future general and comrade Juan Araneta, José Rizal, and other Filipinos who later figured in the Philippine Revolution.

While a student in Manila, he had the opportunity to meet the co-founder of the Katipunan, Andrés Bonifacio, with whom he had a secret blood compact. He was the only Negrense who had this honor and consequently became a member of the revolutionary society.

Family

Aniceto first married Rosario Araneta, a direct descendant of the Kabungsuan royal family of Mindanao, daughter of Patricio Cabunsol Araneta and Leoncia Araneta, with whom he sired eleven children. With his second wife, Magdalena Torres, he had 10 children.

Properties
When his father became bedridden, Lacson took charge of all the work in the haciendas and did much to improve the properties. As a result, through his efforts his father became one of the richest men in Negros and the Philippines. When the time came to divide his father's properties his other brothers chose the best haciendas. He, for his part, chose the uncultivated ones. Thus, he received more land from his father than his brothers. Through hard work, he improved all the land and turned it into one of the best producing haciendas in Negros.

In the later 19th century, a Swiss businessman by the name of Luchinger decided to sell his vast properties in Matabang, Talisay, which he earlier purchased from Nicholas Loney, the biggest sugar cane producer in Negros at that time. It was offered to Aniceto Lacson, but he did not have enough ready cash. Luchinger was willing to sell it on installment but Aniceto's father Lucio refused as the venture appeared risky. Aniceto negotiated with Luchinger to agree to sell it to him without guarantor. Knowing that Aniceto was hardworking, honest and followed through with his business commitments, Luchinger agreed.

His home in Talisay City, Negros Occidental is owned by his descendants the Claparols family.

The Republic of Negros
The Spanish Governor of Negros Island, Isidro Castro, surrendered to forces under Aniceto Lacson and Juan Araneta at Bacolod on 6 November 1898.  The Cantonal Republic of Negros was established with Aniceto Lacson as its president from November 27, 1898, until March 4, 1899, when the Negros revolutionaries surrendered to the United States General James Francis Smith. The government lasted for three months and four days.

Ancestry

See also
 Negros Revolution
 Silay City
 Bacolod

References

External links
 Lacson Clan Website Hall of Fame
 Lacson Clan Website

Filipino generals
People of the Philippine Revolution
1857 births
1931 deaths
People from Iloilo City
20th-century Filipino businesspeople
People from Negros Occidental
Ateneo de Manila University alumni
Governors of Negros Occidental
Filipino revolutionaries
19th-century Filipino businesspeople